Below a list of all National champions in the Women's 5000 metres (track outdoor) in track and field from several countries since 1980. In most countries however the event was contested for the first time in 1995. Until then the 3000 metres was the main middle-distance track event for women.

Australia

1995: Carolyn Schuwalow
1996: Kate Anderson
1997: Kate Anderson
1998: Annette Cross
1999: Natalie Harvey
2000: Annette Cross
2001: Elizabeth Miller
2002: Hayley McGregor
2003: Benita Johnson
2004: Georgina Clarke
2005: Benita Johnson
2006: Eloise Wellings
2007: Benita Johnson
2008: Georgina Clarke
2009: Sarah Jamieson

Belgium

1995: Marleen Renders
1996: Marleen Renders
1997: Anne-Marie Danneels
1998: Anne-Marie Danneels
1999: Anja Smolders
2000: Anja Smolders
2001: Stefanija Statkuvienė
2002: Mounia Aboulahcen
2003: Sigrid Vanden Bempt
2004: Fatima Baouf
2005: Nathalie DeVos
2006: Anja Smolders
2007: Sigrid Vanden Bempt
2008: Elke Van Hoeymissen
2009: Veerle Van linden
2010: Sigrid Vanden Bempt
2011: Sigrid Vanden Bempt
2012: Veerle Van linden
2013: Veerle Van linden
2014: Veerle Van linden
2015: Veerle Van linden
2016: Barbara Maveau

Canada

1995: Kathy Butler
1996: Tina Connelly
1997: Carol Howe
1998: Sherri Smith
1999: Kathy Butler
2000: Tina Connelly
2001: Courtney Babcock
2002: Courtney Babcock
2003: Sean Kaley
2004: Emilie Mondor
2005: Emilie Mondor
2006: Megan Metcalfe
2007: Megan Metcalfe
2008: Megan Metcalfe
2009: Tara Quinn

Denmark

1995: Nina Christiansen
1996: Nina Christiansen
1997: Anja Jørgensen
1998: Dorte Vibjerg
1999: Annemette Jensen
2000: Annemette Jensen
2001: Gitte Karlshøj
2002: Gitte Karlshøj
2003: Dorte Vibjerg
2004: Louise Brasen
2005: Gitte Karlshøj
2006: Louise Mørch
2007: Maria Sig Møller
2008: Maria Sig Møller
2009: Lisbeth Pedersen

England

1980: Susan Hutton
1981: Kathryn Binns
1982: Monica Joyce
1983: Paula Fudge
1984: Shireen Samy-Barbour
1985: Monica Joyce
1986: Marina Samy
1987: Catherine Newman
1988: Jane Shields
1989: Sue Crehan
1990: Sally Ellis
1991: Amanda Wright
1992: Amanda Wright
1993: Suzanne Rigg
1994: Shireen Samy-Barbour
1995: Alison Wyeth
1996: Paula Radcliffe
1997: Andrea Whitcombe
1998: Andrea Whitcombe
1999: Sarah Wilkinson
2000: Paula Radcliffe
2001: Joanne Pavey
2002: Hayley Yelling
2003: Hayley Yelling
2004: Joanne Pavey
2005: Joanne Pavey
2006: Hayley Yelling
2007: Joanne Pavey
2008: Joanne Pavey
2009: Charlotte Purdue

Estonia

1999: Liilia Kesküla
2000: Külli Kaljus
2001: Kadri Kelve
2002: Kadri Kelve
2003: Kadri Kelve
2004: Kadri Kelve
2005: Jekaterina Patjuk
2006: Jekaterina Patjuk
2007: Jekaterina Patjuk
2008: Jekaterina Patjuk
2009: Jekaterina Patjuk
2010: Jekaterina Patjuk
2011: Annika Rihma
2012: Jekaterina Patjuk
2013: Jekaterina Patjuk
2014: Jekaterina Patjuk
2015: Jekaterina Patjuk
2016: Egle-Helene Ervin
2017: Jekaterina Patjuk
2018: Lily Luik

Finland

1995: Annemari Sandell
1996: Päivi Tikkanen
1997: Tuula Laitinen
1998: Päivi Tikkanen
1999: Annemari Sandell
2000: Annemari Sandell
2001: Elina Lindgren
2002: Ulla Tuimala
2003: Kirsi Valasti
2004: Kirsi Valasti
2005: Annemari Sandell
2006: Ulla Tuimala
2007: Elina Lindgren
2008: Annemari Sandell-Hyvärinen
2009: Annemari Sandell-Hyvärinen
2010: Sandra Eriksson
2011: Heidi Eriksson
2012: Sandra Eriksson
2013: Minna Lamminen
2014: Johanna Peiponen

France

1995: Rosario Murcia
1996: Farida Fates
1997: Zahia Dahmani
1998: Blandine Bitzner
1999: Fatima Yvelain
2000: Fatima Yvelain
2001: Fatima Yvelain
2002: Fatima Yvelain
2003: Christelle Daunay
2004: Christelle Daunay
2005: Margaret Maury
2006: Christine Bardelle
2007: Christine Bardelle
2008: Saadia Bourgaih
2009: Christine Bardelle

Germany

1995: Uta Pippig
1996: Petra Wassiluk
1997: Kristina Wollheim
1998: Kristina Wollheim
1999: Irina Mikitenko
2000: Irina Mikitenko
2001: Sabrina Mockenhaupt
2002: Sabrina Mockenhaupt
2003: Sabrina Mockenhaupt
2004: Sabrina Mockenhaupt
2005: Sabrina Mockenhaupt
2006: Irina Mikitenko
2007: Sabrina Mockenhaupt
2008: Sabrina Mockenhaupt
2009: Sabrina Mockenhaupt
2010: Sabrina Mockenhaupt
2011: Sabrina Mockenhaupt
2012: Sabrina Mockenhaupt
2013: Sabrina Mockenhaupt
2014: Sabrina Mockenhaupt
2015: Alina Reh

Italy

1995: Silvia Sommaggio
1996: Roberta Brunet
1997: Lucilla Andreucci
1998: Elisa Rea
1999: Elisa Rea
2000: Roberta Brunet
2001: Elisa Rea
2002: Gloria Marconi
2003: Agata Balsamo
2004: Gloria Marconi
2005: Silvia Weissteiner
2006: Silvia Weissteiner
2007: Claudia Pinna
2008: Elena Romagnolo
2009: Federica Dal Ri
2010: Federica Dal Ri
2011: Silvia Weissteiner
2012: Silvia Weissteiner
2013: Giulia Viola
2014: Giulia Viola
2015: Silvia Weissteiner
2016: Veronica Inglese
2017: Valeria Roffino
2018: Nadia Battocletti

Japan

1995: Atsumi Yashima
1996: Yoshiko Ichikawa
1997: Yoshiko Ichikawa
1998: Michiko Shimizu
1999: Yoshiko Ichikawa
2000: Yoshiko Fujinaga
2001: Haruko Okamoto
2002: Kayoko Fukushi
2003: Mari Ozaki
2004: Kayoko Fukushi
2005: Kayoko Fukushi
2006: Kayoko Fukushi
2007: Kayoko Fukushi
2008: Yuriko Kobayashi
2009: Yurika Nakamura

Latvia

1994: Tatjana Ribakova
1995: Jeļena Čelnova
1996: Jeļena Čelnova
1997: Jeļena Čelnova
1998: Inna Masjunas
1999: Inna Masjunas
2000: Jeļena Prokopčuka
2001: Inâra Lûse
2002: Jeļena Prokopčuka
2003: Inna Poluškina
2004: Inna Poluškina
2005: Jeļena Prokopčuka
2006: Svetlana Ivanova
2007: ???
2008: Agnese Pastare
2009: Agnese Pastare
2010: Inna Poluškina

Netherlands

1995: Grete Koens
1996: Christine Toonstra
1997: Silvia Kruijer
1998: Erika van de Bilt
1999: Wilma van Onna
2000: Erika van de Bilt
2001: Vivian Ruijters
2002: Nadezhda Wijenberg
2003: Miranda Boonstra
2004: Anita Looper
2005: Anita Looper
2006: Anita Looper
2007: Selma Borst
2008: Ilse Pol
2009: Lesley van Miert
2010: Marieke Falkmann
2011: Ilse Pol
2012: Lesley van Miert
2013: Helen Hofstede
2014: Jip Vastenburg
2015: Jamie van Lieshout
2016: Susan Kuijken

New Zealand

1986: Debbie Elsmore
1987: Anne Audain
1988: Sonia Barry
1989: Anne Hannam
1990: Anne Hare
1991: Anne Hare
1992: Sharon Clode
1993: Linden Wilde
1994: Anne Hare
1995: Anne Hare
1996: Nyla Carroll
1997: Linden Wilde
1998: Nyla Carroll
1999: Melissa Moon
2000: Sarah Christie
2001: Melissa Moon
2002: Kim Smith
2003: Nyla Carroll
2004: Nina Rillstone
2005: Melissa Moon
2006: Kim Smith
2007: Belinda Wimmer
2008: Kim Smith
2009: Rachel Kingsford
2010: Jessica Ruthe
2011: Kellie Palmer
2012: Hannah Newbould
2013: Becky Wade (USA)
2014: Camille Buscomb
2015: Camille Buscomb
2016: Camille Buscomb

Norway

1982: Ingrid Kristiansen
1983: Mona Kleppe
1984: Mona Kleppe
1985: Grete Kirkeberg
1986: Grete Kirkeberg
1987: Anita Håkenstad
1988: Grethe Fosse
1989: Ingrid Kristiansen
1990: Sissel Grottenberg
1991: Ingrid Kristiansen
1992: Grete Kirkeberg
1993: Torhild Dybwad
1994: Not Held
1995: Not Held
1996: Gunhild Halle Haugen
1997: Gunhild Halle Haugen
1998: Susanne Wigene
1999: Gunhild Halle Haugen
2000: Gunhild Halle Haugen
2001: Gunhild Halle Haugen
2002: Gunhild Halle Haugen
2003: Bente Landøy
2004: Susanne Wigene
2005: Susanne Wigene
2006: Kirsten Otterbu
2007: Ingunn Opsal
2008: Karoline Bjerkeli Grøvdal
2009: Kristen Størmer

Poland

1984: Renata Kokowska
1985: Wanda Panfil
1986: Renata Kokowska
1987: Wanda Panfil
1988: Wanda Panfil
1989: Wanda Panfil
1990: Grażyna Kowina
1991–1994: Not Held
1995: Dorota Gruca
1996: Danuta Marczyk
1997: Justyna Bąk
1998: Dorota Gruca
1999: Dorota Gruca
2000: Justyna Bąk
2001: Justyna Bąk
2002: Wioletta Janowska
2003: Grażyna Syrek
2004: Wioletta Janowska
2005: Justyna Bąk
2006: Grażyna Syrek
2007: Wioletta Janowska
2008: Wioletta Janowska
2009: Karolina Jarzyńska
2010: Wioletta Frankiewicz (Janowska)
2011: Lidia Chojecka
2012: Wioletta Frankiewicz (Janowska)
2013: Karolina Jarzyńska
2014: Justyna Korytkowska
2015: Renata Pliś
2016: Katarzyna Kowalska
2017: Katarzyna Rutkowska
2018: Paulina Kaczyńska
2019: Katarzyna Jankowska (Rutkowska)

Portugal

1995: Conceição Ferreira
1996: Marina Bastos Rodrigues
1997: Marina Bastos Rodrigues
1998: Marina Bastos Rodrigues
1999: Marina Bastos Rodrigues
2000: Fernanda Ribeiro
2001: Ana Dias
2002: Fernanda Ribeiro
2003: Fernanda Ribeiro
2004: Fernanda Ribeiro
2005: Inês Monteiro
2006: Jessica Augusto
2007: Cláudia Pereira
2008: Carla Martinho
2009: Ana Dias
2010: Dulce Félix
2011: Dulce Félix
2012: Ana Mafalda Ferreira

Russia

1993: Tatyana Pentukova
1994: Klara Kachapova
1995: Viktoriya Nenasheva
1996: Viktoriya Nenasheva
1997: Elena Kopytova
1998: Svetlana Baygulova
1999: Olga Yegorova
2000: Tatyana Tomasheva
2001: Olga Rosseyeva
2002: Liliya Shobukhova
2003: Gulnara Samitova
2004: Gulnara Samitova
2005: Liliya Shobukhova
2006: Regina Rakhimkulova
2007: Yekaterina Volkova
2008: Liliya Shobukhova
2009: Mariya Konovalova

South Africa

1995: Juliet Prowse
1996: Alta Verster
1997: Alta Verster
1998: Alta Verster
1999: Carlien Cornelissen
2000: René Kalmer
2001: René Kalmer
2002: Rika Feuth
2003: Poppy Mlambo
2004: René Kalmer
2005: Poppy Mlambo
2006: Zintle Xiniwe
2007: René Kalmer
2008: René Kalmer
2009: Dinah-Lebo Phalula

Spain

1982: Pilar Fernández
1983: Pilar Fernández
1984: Ana Isabel Alonso
1985: Amelia Lorza
1986: María Carmen Valero
1987: Asunción Sinobas
1988: Angelines Rodriguez
1989: Estela Estévez
1990: Estela Estévez
1991: Estela Estévez
1992: Estela Estévez
1993: Julia Vaquero
1994: Rocío Ríos
1995: Maria Teresa Recio
1996: Julia Vaquero
1997: Cristina Maria Petite
1998: Marta Domínguez
1999: Marta Domínguez
2000: Marta Domínguez
2001: Marta Domínguez
2002: Marta Domínguez
2003: Marta Domínguez
2004: María Luisa Larraga
2005: Yesenia Centeno
2006: Judit Pla
2007: Marta Romo
2008: Dolores Checa
2009: Judit Pla
2010: Judit Pla
2011: Dolores Checa
2012: Nuria Fernández

Ukraine 

1992: not contested
1993: not contested
1994: not contested
1995: Tamara Koba
1996: Olena Vyazova
1997: Tetyana Bilovol
1998: Tetyana Bilovol
1999: Svetlana Nekhorosh
2000: Nataliya Berkut
2001: Tetyana Bilovol
2002: Maryna Dubrova
2003: Nataliya Sidorenko
2004: Maryna Dubrova
2005: Maryna Dubrova
2006: Nataliya Berkut
2007: Tetyana Holovchenko
2008: Tetyana Holovchenko
2009: Tetyana Holovchenko
2010: Tetyana Holovchenko
2011: Olha Skrypak
2012: Hanna Nosenko
2013: Viktoriya Pohoryelska
2014: Hanna Nosenko
2015: Valentyna Zhudina
2016: Viktoriya Pohoryelska
2017: Yuliya Shmatenko
2018: Olena Serdyuk
2019: Viktoriya Kalyuzhna
2020: Yuliya Shmatenko

United States

1983: Judi St Hilaire
1984: Katie Ishmael
1985: Suzanne Girard
1986: Betty Jo Geiger
1987: Nanette Davis
1988: Brenda Webb
1989: Melinda Schmidt
1990: PattiSue Plumer
1991: PattiSue Plumer
1992: Christine Boyd
1993: Christine McNamara
1994: Cecilia St Geme
1995: Gina Procaccio
1996: Lynn Jennings
1997: Libbie Hickman
1998: Regina Jacobs
1999: Regina Jacobs
2000: Regina Jacobs
2001: Marla Runyan
2002: Marla Runyan
2003: Marla Runyan
2004: Shayne Culpepper
2005: Shalane Flanagan
2006: Lauren Fleshman
2007: Shalane Flanagan
2008: Kara Goucher
2009: Kara Goucher
2010: Lauren Fleshman
2011: Molly Huddle
2012: Julie Culley
2013: Jennifer Simpson
2014: Molly Huddle
2015: Nicole Tully

See also
 National champions 5000 metres (men)

References

 GBRathletics
 ARRS site
 New Zealand Champions

Women
5000 metres
National